The East Coast of the United States, also known as the Eastern Seaboard, the Atlantic Coast, and the Atlantic Seaboard, is the coastline where the Eastern United States meets the North Atlantic Ocean. This region includes Connecticut, Delaware, Florida, Georgia, Maine, Maryland, Massachusetts, New Hampshire, New York, New Jersey, North Carolina, Pennsylvania, Rhode Island, South Carolina, Vermont, Virginia, West Virginia, and the federal capital of Washington, D.C.. 

Although Pennsylvania, Vermont, and West Virginia have no Atlantic Ocean coastline, they are also part of the East Coast of the U.S. because of their presence in the East Coast regions of the Mid-Atlantic, New England, and Old South, respectively, and because each were members of the original Thirteen Colonies from which the nation was formed following the Revolutionary War.

Toponymy and composition
The place name East Coast derives from the idea that the contiguous 48 states are defined by two major coastlines, one at the western edge and one on the eastern edge. Other terms for referring to this area include the Eastern Seaboard, which is another term for coastline), Atlantic Coast, and Atlantic Seaboard because the coastline lies along the Atlantic Ocean.

The 14 states that have a shoreline on the Atlantic Ocean are (from north to south): Maine, New Hampshire, Massachusetts, Rhode Island, Connecticut, New York, New Jersey, Delaware, Maryland, Virginia, North Carolina, South Carolina, Georgia, and Florida. Pennsylvania and Washington, D.C. border the Delaware River and the Potomac River, respectively, both of which are tidal arms of the Atlantic Ocean.

Colonial history
The original Thirteen Colonies of Great Britain in North America all lay along the East Coast.

Two additional U.S. states on the East Coast were not among the original Thirteen Colonies: Maine became part of the English colony of Massachusetts in 1677 and Florida was held by the British from the end of the French and Indian War until 1781 and was part of New Spain until 1821. Florida's written history begins with the arrival of Europeans; the Spanish explorer Juan Ponce de León in 1513 made the first textual records. The state received its name from this Spanish conquistador, who called the peninsula La Pascua Florida in recognition of the verdant landscape and because it was the Easter season, which the Spaniards called Pascua Florida (Festival of Flowers).

The Middle Colonies of Delaware, New Jersey, New York, and Pennsylvania had been colonized by the Dutch as New Netherland  until they were ceded to the English in the mid- to late-17th century.

Climate and physical geography

Three basic climate regions occur on the East Coast according to the Köppen climate classification and four occur according to the Trewartha climate classification from north to south based on the monthly mean temperature of the coldest month (January) and the number of months averaging above 50°F (10°C), respectively:

The region from northern Maine and Upstate New York south to most of Connecticut, most of northern New Jersey, and western Maryland has a humid continental climate (Dfa/Dfb/Dc), with warm-to-hot summers, cold and snowy winters with at least one month averaging below freezing, and four to seven months with mean temperatures warmer than 50°F

The area from Martha's Vineyard, extreme SW Rhode Island, and areas of coastal Connecticut SW to southern Delaware and western North Carolina has a warm temperate climate (Cfa Köppen/Do Trewartha) with long and hot summers with at least one month over 22°C (71.6°F), cool winters with all months over freezing, and six to seven months above 50°F. 

The area from the southern Delmarva Peninsula, SE Virginia, and central NC south to central Florida is subtropical (Cfa/Cf), with hot and rainy summers, mild and drier winters, and eight to twelve months above 50°F. Around south-central Florida southward (from the line from Stuart to Fort Myers south through the Florida Keys) exists a tropical climate (Af/Aw/Ar) that is frost-free, is warm to hot all year, and has all months averaging above 18°C (64.4°F). This is the only tropical climate in the continental U.S.

The least common climate on the East Coast is the oceanic (Cfb/Do), which is only found on Block Island and Nantucket and in areas of the southern Appalachian Mountains. This zone has all monthly averages between 0 and 22°C and six to seven months above 50°F.

Seasonally, average monthly precipitation ranges from a slight late fall (November) maximum from Massachusetts northward (as at Portland, Maine), to a slight summer maximum in the Mid-Atlantic states from southern Connecticut south to Virginia (as at Wilmington, Delaware and Norfolk, Virginia), to a more pronounced summer maximum from Cape Hatteras, North Carolina, southward along the Southeastern United States coast to Savannah, Georgia. The Florida peninsula has a sharp wet-summer/dry-winter pattern, with 60 to 70% of precipitation falling between June and October in an average year and a dry, and sunny late fall, winter, and early spring.

Although landfalls are rare, the Eastern Seaboard is susceptible to hurricanes in the Atlantic hurricane season, officially running from June 1 to November 30, although hurricanes can occur before or after these dates. Hurricanes Hazel, Hugo, Bob, Isabel, Irene, and Sandy, and most recently Florence, Isaias, Henri, and Ida are some of the more significant storms to have affected the region.

The East Coast (except for eastern Maine) is a low-relief, passive margin coast. It has been shaped by the Pleistocene glaciation in the far northern areas in New England, with offshore islands such as Nantucket, Martha's Vineyard, Block Island, and Fishers Island. From around northern New Jersey southward, the coastal plain broadens southwards, separated from the Piedmont region by the Atlantic Seaboard fall line of the East Coast rivers, often marking the head of navigation and prominent sites of cities. The coastal areas from Long Island south to Florida are often made up of barrier islands that front the coastal areas, with the long stretches of sandy beaches. Many of the larger capes along the lower East Coast are in fact barrier islands, like the Outer Banks of North Carolina and Cape Canaveral, Florida. The Florida Keys are made up of limestone coral and provide the only coral reefs on the US mainland.

Demographics
In 2010, the population of the states that have shoreline on the East Coast was estimated at 112,642,503 (36% of the country's total population). New York City is both the largest city and the largest metropolitan area on the East Coast. The East Coast is the most populated coastal area in the United States.

Transportation

The primary Interstate Highway along the East Coast is Interstate 95, completed in 2018, which replaced the historic U.S. Route 1 (Atlantic Highway), the original federal highway that traversed all East Coast states, except Delaware. By water, the East Coast is connected from Boston, Massachusetts to Miami, Florida, by the Intracoastal Waterway, also known as the East Coast Canal, which was completed in 1912. Amtrak's Downeaster and Northeast Regional offer the main passenger rail service on the Seaboard. The Acela Express offers the only high-speed rail passenger service in the Americas. Between New York and Boston the Acela Express has up to a 54% share of the combined train and air passenger market.

Some of the largest airports in the United States are located along the East Coast of the United States, such as John F. Kennedy International Airport in New York, Logan International Airport in Boston, Newark Liberty Airport in Newark, New Jersey, Philadelphia International Airport in Philadelphia, Baltimore–Washington International Airport near Baltimore, Washington-Dulles International Airport near Washington, D.C., Hartsfield–Jackson International Airport in Atlanta, Miami International Airport in Miami, Charlotte Douglas International Airport in Charlotte, Tampa International Airport in Tampa and Orlando International Airport in Orlando, Florida.

Culture

As the first spot in the United States that immigrants arrived and the close proximity of Europe, the Caribbean and Latin America, the East Coast is home to a diverse population and home to multi-cultures when compared to the rest of the US. From the strong Latin culture in southern Florida and New York City, to the 200-year-old Gullah culture of the low country coastal islands of Georgia and South Carolina, to the many historic cities in the Middle Atlantic where a strong English, German, Italian, Irish, and French culture are present, the East Coast is significantly more diverse than the rest of the United States. Numerous Chinatowns in New York City, and Little Havana in Miami, are examples of such cultural centers in the bigger cities.

The East Coast is home to much of the political and financial power of the United States, as well as the center for resort and travel destinations in the United States. New York City is the largest city and financial center of the world. Seventy-one of the world's Fortune 500 companies have their corporate headquarters in New York City, while Midtown Manhattan with 400 million square feet of office space in 2018, is the largest central business district in the world. Washington, D.C. is the capital and political nerve center of the United States. Many organizations such as defense contractors, civilian contractors, nonprofit organizations, lobbying firms, trade unions, industry trade groups and professional associations have their headquarters in or near Washington, D.C., in order to be close to the federal government.

Miami and Florida are two of the top domestic and international travel destinations in the United States. Miami is the warmest major city in the United States in winter, this factor contributes to it being a major tourism hub for international visitors. Miami has one of the largest concentrations of international banks in the United States, and the third tallest skyline in the U.S. with over 300 high-rises, 55 of which exceed 490 ft (149 m). The port of Miami is the busiest cruise port in the world in both passenger traffic and cruise lines, with over 5.5 million cruise passengers passing through the port each year. The center for tropical plant culture and research in the United States is based in Miami at Fairchild Tropical Botanic Garden, while the state of Florida is the number two producer of oranges in the world behind Brazil.

See also 

 Atlantic coastal plain
 Atlantic Seaboard fall line
 BosWash (Boston, Massachusetts, and Washington, D.C.)
 Northeast megalopolis
 West Coast of the United States
 Gulf Coast of the United States
East Coast–West Coast hip hop rivalry

Notes

References 

 
 East
Regions of the United States
Eastern United States
Northeastern United States
Southeastern United States
Regions of the Southern United States
Landforms of Maine
Landforms of New Hampshire
Landforms of Massachusetts
Landforms of Rhode Island
Landforms of Connecticut
Landforms of New York (state)
Landforms of New Jersey
Landforms of Delaware
Landforms of Maryland
Landforms of Virginia
Landforms of North Carolina
Landforms of South Carolina
Landforms of Georgia (U.S. state)
Landforms of Florida